Martinsville Independent School District is a public school district based in the community of Martinsville, Texas, US.

Martinsville ISD has one school that serves students in grades Pre-K though twelve. The current enrollment is 321 students.

In 2009, the school district was rated "academically acceptable" by the Texas Education Agency.

References

External links
Martinsville ISD

School districts in Nacogdoches County, Texas